Frida Maria Fornander (born 4 July 1995) is a Swedish model and beauty pageant titleholder. She was crowned Miss Earth Sweden 2014, and competed in Miss Earth 2014. Later, she also won Miss Universe Sweden 2017 and competed in Miss Universe 2017.

Prior to competing in Miss Earth, Fornander had already won the titles of Miss Teenager Sweden 2011 and Miss Teen Model Universe 2012. Fornander has been working as an international model since 2011.

References

External links

Swedish female models
Swedish beauty pageant winners
1995 births
Living people
Miss Universe 2017 contestants
Miss Earth 2014 contestants